Glory Defined is an EP by the Christian rock band Building 429, which was released in 2004. The recording was made and distributed to promote the band's third full-length album entitled, Space in Between Us. Glory Defined was also the band's major-label debut and contained their first number one hit, "Glory Defined".

Track listing

Awards
On 2005, the title song was nominated for two Dove Awards: Song of the Year and Rock Recorded Song of the Year at the 36th GMA Dove Awards.

Personnel 

Building 429
 Jason Roy — lead vocals, guitar, piano
 Paul Bowden — guitars
 Scotty Beshears — bass 
 Michael Anderson — drums

Production
 Jim Cooper – producer
 Blaine Barcus – A&R direction
Guest musicians
 Brent Milligan
 Jim Cooper
 David Allan

References

External links 
 

Building 429 albums